Remember Us: Youth Part 2 is the fourth extended play by South Korean band DAY6. It was released by JYP Entertainment on December 10, 2018.

Background and release 
Following the release of Shoot Me: Youth Part 1 on June 26, 2018, it was announced that the second part would most likely be released by the end of the year. On November 23, it was revealed that the EP, entitled Remember Us: Youth Part 2, would be available on December 10.

The track list was released on November 26, 2018. Two days later, motion posters of each members were released. Solo teasers of Sungjin, Jae, Young K, Wonpil and Dowoon were unveiled on a daily basis from November 29 to December 3 at 12AM (KST).

Group and unit teaser images were published on December 4. Two music video teasers were revealed on December 5 and 6 respectively. The online cover was released the following day. On December 8, an album sampler was made available on Youtube. On December 10, the EP was released, along with the music video for "days gone by".

Promotion 
On December 10, 2018, three hours after the album's release,  a "Comeback Show" was broadcast live on Naver's V LIVE broadcasting site featuring Day6 presenting their new songs.

Day6 held their comeback stage on KBS2's Music Bank on December 14 and promoted "days gone by" on several music programs in South Korea, including Show! Music Core and Inkigayo.

Track listing

Charts

Singles
"Days Gone By"

Release history

References 

2018 EPs
JYP Entertainment EPs
Korean-language EPs
Pop rock EPs
Day6 EPs
IRiver EPs